The UNIVAC 490 was a 30-bit word magnetic-core memory machine with 16K or 32K words; 4.8 microsecond cycle time made by UNIVAC. Seymour Cray designed this system before he left UNIVAC to join the early Control Data Corporation.

It was a commercial derivative of a computer Univac Federal Systems developed for the United States Navy. That system was the heart of the Naval Tactical Data System which pioneered the use of shipboard computers for air defense. The military version went by a variety of names: UNIVAC 1232, AN/USQ-20, MIL-1206 and CP642.

Overview 
At least 47 of these machines were made (serial numbers run from 101 to 147). Six were installed at NASA and played important roles in Gemini and the Apollo missions.  The U490 had complete control of most or all of the data readout screens in Houston Mission Control. The USAF had two installed, as did Lockheed.

Airlines using the 490 Real-Time system included Eastern and Northwest Orient – principally airline reservations systems at Eastern Air Lines (1963) and British European Airways (BEACON – 1964). Other commercial installations of the 490 Real-Time included two at Westinghouse, and one each at Alcoa, U.S. Steel, Bethlehem Steel and General Motors.

The only surviving, nearly complete, original, civilian version of the 490 Real Time System is on display at System Source in Hunt Valley, Maryland. It has six banks of memory cores. System Source also has a nearly complete set of original documentation for the machine, including original blueprints and troubleshooting data. This includes the Boss and Wilen document.

The standard Operating System was REX (RealTime Exec), except at Eastern and B.E.A. where a custom operating system was developed for airline reservations (CONTORTS – CONTrol Of Real Time System).  CONTORTS was the origin of Univac's subsequent RT operating systems for 494 (STARS) and later converted to the 1100 Series (RTOS).

Architecture 

The instruction word format:
f – Function code designator (6 bits)
j – Branch condition designator (3 bits)
k – Operand-interpretation designator (3 bits)
b – Operand address modification designator (3 bits)
y – Operand designator (15 bits)

Numbers were represented in ones' complement.

The machine provided the programmer with the following registers:
Seven B-registers (Address modifying index registers) 15 bits each
One A-register or accumulator 30 bits
One Q-register and auxiliary arithmetic register 30 bits

Hardware 

Construction (Arithmetic unit only)

 Type           Quantity
 Diodes         37,543 All types
 Transistors    13,819 All types

See also 
 AN/USQ-17
 List of UNIVAC products
 History of computing hardware

References

External links 
UNIVAC 490 Real-Time System
UNIVAC 490 manuals
UNIVAC 490 at the System Source Computer Museum

490